Konanur may refer to:

 Konanur, Hassan district, Karnataka, India
 Konanur, Mysore district, Karnataka, India
 Konanur railway station, Mysore district, Karnataka, India

See also 
 Kannur, also known as Cannanore, a city in Kannur district, Kerala, India
 South Kannanur, a town in Tamil Nadu, India